The Alexander Hamilton Institute is a former institute for business education in New York City founded in 1909, and dissolved in the 1980s. The Alexander Hamilton Institute was a corporation engaged in collecting, organizing and transmitting business information.

History

Initiative 
As Dean of New York University School of Commerce, Accounts and Finance, Joseph French Johnson had for many years continually received letters requesting advice on what to read on business. These demands came not only from young men, but from mature and able executives, and sometimes even from the most successful business leaders. To all such requests Dean Johnson was obliged to reply that the only practical way to study the fundamental principles of business in a systematic manner was to attend the lectures in university schools of commerce.

At that time the literature of business was scanty and for the most part of doubtful value. Working alone, a man could get but little help in his efforts to widen and deepen his knowledge of business principles. It became evident that there was a great need for an organized, logical statement of the basic principles on which successful business is founded. It was determined to establish an institution which should meet the demand. After years of preparation the Alexander Hamilton Institute was established in 1909.

Its name 
In selecting the name, it was agreed that none could be so suitable as that of Alexander Hamilton (1757–1804). Hamilton is perhaps chiefly remembered for his masterly statesmanship; but he was equally conspicuous as soldier, financier, author, organizer and practical economist.

Hamilton was considered to be the greatest manager ever employed by the United States Government. When he became the first Secretary of the Treasury in 1789, he found a chaotic government, without money, without credit, and without organization. He secured order, provided funds and created prosperity. He investigated the industries and directed the early commercial development of the United States. The Alexander Hamilton Institute (1921) summarized: "He touched the dead corpse of the public credit, and it sprang upon its feet. He smote the rock of the nation's resources and abundant streams of revenue gushed forth."

Hamilton was a great executive and systematizer; he himself worked out an accounting system for the United States Government which, with but slight modifications, remained in force for more than a hundred years.

The plan 
The Modern Business Course and Service is a systematic, time-saving method of bringing to any man's office or home that business knowledge and training which he needs, but which he cannot acquire through his own experience.

It is designed for the benefit of two groups of men:
 those who already are in executive or semi-executive positions;
 young men who have brains and the ambition to become business executives.

It is intended, in general, for the men who are looking and moving ahead; for live, keen-witted, energetic men; for men who are not satisfied to remain in the ranks or in subordinate positions. These men may or may not have had a thorough school and college training; that is not an essential. They may or may not have wealth and high position; that is unimportant. But they must have ability and enough serious purpose to spend a portion of their spare time in reading and thinking about business problems.

"Survey of Modern Business Science" 

In their 1921 "Forging Ahead in Business" the Alexander Hamilton Institute claimed there are four fundamental activities in every business: Production, Marketing, Financing, and Accounting. The accompanying illustration shows the whole field of business charted in such a way as to show clearly the relation of various business activities to each other. Economics, the study of business conditions and business policies, is the hub of all business activity. Radiating from it are the four grand divisions of business : Production, Marketing, Financing, Accounting. These in turn are subdivided into the more detailed activities which they include.

All business activities may be classified under Production, Marketing, Financing and Accounting. For purposes of systematic study, each of these may be subdivided as shown above. In addition, there are two important forces which control business : Man and Government. For that reason a discussion of the relation between "Business and the Man" and "Business and the Government" naturally forms a part of the survey of modern business. The first two and the last two assignments in the Modern Business Course and Service cover these important subjects.

The arrangement of the subjects has been carefully planned so that the maximum benefit will be derived by following the assignments in their regular order. In the chart you see the logical arrangement of these subjects as related to the business world. Note that the order in which these subjects are treated in the Course is not according to their arrangement in the chart. On the contrary, the more general subjects are first considered; then come the more complex—the specializations and enlargements upon the foundation subjects. This plan permits a progressive arrangement that makes for a broad understanding of the science of business.

Just as any university or college requires a knowledge of certain subjects before others can be taken up, because this more general knowledge is essential to a proper understanding of the more advanced, so we have arranged the subjects treated in the Modern Business Course and Service in a similar manner.

Texts, Talks, Lectures, Problems, Monthly Letters, Financial and Trade Reviews, Reports and Service—these are the important features of the Modern Business Course and Service.

People involved 
Faculty members
 Bruce Fairchild Barton, lecturer
 T. Coleman du Pont, Business Executive and Advisory Council member.
 Harrington Emerson, Efficiency Engineer and special lecturer.
 John Hays Hammond, Consulting Engineer and Advisory Council member.
 Jeremiah Jenks, Research Professor and Advisory Council member.
 Joseph French Johnson founding dean.
 Dexter S. Kimball, Professor and management author.
 William H. Lough, co-founder and its first vice-president. 
 John Thomas Madden, third Dean, started in 1929. 
 Harrison McJohnston, Professor of business communication and advertising. 
 Charles Miller (businessman), businessman, that lectured for the institute.
 Edward P. Moxey, Professor of Accounting at the Wharton School of Finance and Commerce
 Frank A. Vanderlip, Financier and Advisory Council member.

Other notable authors
 Ralph C. Davis, Professor of Business Organization at New York University
 Lee Galloway, Professor of Commerce and Industry at New York University

Alumni
 Ellsworth Hunt Augustus, businessman.
 Bruce Fairchild Barton, author, advertising executive, and politician.
 Ken Boles, American politician in the state of Florida.
 Armand Cloutier, Canadian Liberal party member
 Homer Heck, American businessman and politician

Trivia 
The Alexander Hamilton Institute was referenced disparagingly along with H. L. Mencken in The Sun Also Rises by Ernest Hemingway (1926).

References 

Attribution
 This article incorporates public domain material from Alexander Hamilton Institute. Forging ahead in business. New York City, 1921, p. 9-10.

External links 
 

1909 establishments in New York City
Universities and colleges in New York City